Azakhel Bala is a village in Pabbi Tehsil of Nowshera District, Khyber Pakhtunkhwa, Pakistan. The majority of the population of Azakhel Bala is engaged in agriculture, mainly potatoes, sugar cane, wheat, corn, tomato, cucumber, and numerous other vegetables. According to the Pakistan Forest Institute, "pale yellow silt-stone forms the soil parent material near Azakhel Bala village." There is an Afghan Refugee Camp located here.

Education

Public schools
 Government High School Aza Khel Bala for Boys
 Government Higher & Secondary School Aza Khel Bala for Girls
 Government Middle School Aza Khel Bala for Boys
 Government Primary School Aza Khel Bala No,1 for Boys
 Government Primary School Aza Khel Bala No,2 for Boys
 Government Primary School Aza Khel Bala No,3 for Boys
 Government Primary School Aza Khel Bala No,1 for Girls

Private schools
 Nida model school azakhel bala
 Aqsa Public School
 Aza Khel Learning Academy 
 Shah khalid memorial School
 Islamia  Public School
 Iqra Jannatul Hufaz
 Iqra Raozatul Atfal
 Alkhidmat Foundation School
 Usmani Hifz-ul-Quran Academy

Islamic education 

 Daruloom ul Islamia
 Jamia Faredia
 Dar Ul Qura ( Masjid-e-Madani) Mohalla Islamabad

References

Populated places in Nowshera District